The men's 400 metre freestyle event at the 1988 Summer Olympics took place on 23 September at the Jamsil Indoor Swimming Pool in Seoul, South Korea.

Records
Prior to this competition, the existing world and Olympic records were as follows.

The following records were established during the competition:

Results

Heats
Rule: The eight fastest swimmers advance to final A (Q), while the next eight to final B (q).

Note: All eight swimmers who qualified for the Olympic final swam faster than the Olympic record time.

Finals

Final B

Final A

References

External links
 Official Report
 USA Swimming

Swimming at the 1988 Summer Olympics
Men's events at the 1988 Summer Olympics